Caroline Girle (27 December 1736 – 17 November 1817) was a diarist who kept a journal throughout her life. Although some volumes were destroyed, what remains is in the British Library. These journals earned her the sobriquet "The Oxfordshire Diarist".

Girle was the daughter of John Girle  (–1761) and Barbara Slaney (1717–1801), and had an elder brother, John (1735–1746). On 5 August 1762, in Whitchurch-on-Thames, Oxfordshire, Girle married Philip Lybbe Powys; they had four children:
 Caroline (1763–1764)
 Philip Lybbe (1765–1838)
 Thomas (1768–1817)
 Caroline Isabella (1775 – 28 August 1838), who married the Rev. Edward Cooper, a first cousin of Jane Austen.

References

1736 births
1817 deaths
English diarists
Women diarists